Emu Creek is a town in Victoria, Australia in the City of Greater Bendigo local government area, 141.7 kilometres north of the state capital, Melbourne.

References

External links

Towns in Victoria (Australia)
Bendigo
Suburbs of Bendigo